Mariano Ferrario (born January 16, 1974) is an American freestyle skier. He competed in the men's aerials event at the 1998 Winter Olympics.

References

1974 births
Living people
American male freestyle skiers
Olympic freestyle skiers of the United States
Freestyle skiers at the 1998 Winter Olympics
People from Geauga County, Ohio
Sportspeople from Ohio